Castella is a locality in Victoria, Australia.  It lies to the east of Kinglake at the intersection of the Melba Highway and the Healesville Kinglake Road. 

The Castella Quarries produces sandstone and crushed rock.  One of the quarries was used to dump the drillings from a tunnel under the Toolangi State Forest.  This tunnel is part of the Sugarloaf Pipeline, carrying freshwater to Melbourne from the Goulburn River.

References

Towns in Victoria (Australia)
Shire of Murrindindi